This is a list of U.S. states by Non-Hispanic whites population. The United States Census Bureau defines non-Hispanic white as white Americans who are not of Hispanic or Latino ancestry (i.e., having ancestry from Spain or Latin America). At 191.6 million in 2020, non-Hispanic whites comprise 57.8% of the total U.S. population.

Population by state or territory 

In 2020, in 36 out of the 50 US states, non-Latino whites made up a greater percentage of the state's population than the US overall share of 57.8%; however, the 14 states with greater shares of non-whites include the four most populous states (California, Texas, New York, and Florida). The total non-Latino white population shrunk between 2010 and 2020 in 34 out of the 50 states, and the relative share of non-Latino whites in the overall state population has declined in all 50 states during that same time period.

As of 2020, six states are majority-minority: Hawaii, California, New Mexico, Texas, Nevada, and Maryland. All of these states saw larger declines in the relative share of their non-Latino white populations between 1990-2020 than the national average of -23.5% with Nevada dropping by -41.7%, California by -39.3% and Texas by -34.5%.

Historical population by state or territory

See also
 Demographics of the United States
 Lists of U.S. cities with non-white majority populations
 List of U.S. cities with non-Hispanic white plurality populations in 2010
 List of U.S. states by African-American population
 List of U.S. states by Hispanic and Latino population

References

White
White Americans
Non-Hispanic white